Roger Grant may refer to:

Roger Grant (oculist) (died 1724), English quack oculist
Roger Mathew Grant, theorist of music
Roger Grant (EastEnders)